Shimron Odilon Hetmyer (born 26 December 1996) is a Guyanese cricketer who plays as a top order batsman for the West Indies cricket team. Hetmyer captained the Windies to win the 2016 Under-19 Cricket World Cup. During 2018 the International Cricket Council (ICC) named Hetmyer as one of the five breakout stars in men's cricket. He is also the current captain of CPL side Guyana Amazon Warriors.

Domestic and T20 franchise career
He made his Twenty20 (T20) debut in the 2016 Caribbean Premier League (CPL) for the Guyana Amazon Warriors, and was retained for the 2017 edition. In August 2018, he became the youngest batsman to score a century in the CPL, when he made 100 runs for Guyana Amazon Warriors against the Jamaica Tallawahs.

In October 2018, Cricket West Indies (CWI) awarded him a red-ball contract for the 2018–19 season.

In December 2018, he was bought by the Royal Challengers Bangalore in the player auction for the 2019 Indian Premier League. In March 2019, he was named as one of eight players to watch by the International Cricket Council (ICC) ahead of the 2019 Indian Premier League tournament. He was released by the Royal Challengers Bangalore ahead of the 2020 IPL auction. In the 2020 IPL auction, he was bought by the Delhi Capitals ahead of the 2020 Indian Premier League.

In July 2020, he was named in the Guyana Amazon Warriors squad for the 2020 Caribbean Premier League.

In May 2021, in the mini-player replacement draft for the remainder of the postponed 2021 Pakistan Super League, Hetmyer was signed by the Multan Sultans as a replacement for Mahmudullah.

In the 2022 IPL Auction, Hetmyer was bought by the Rajasthan Royals.

International career
He represented the West Indies at Under-19 level, captaining the team to prevail in the 2016 Under-19 Cricket World Cup in Bangladesh, by defeating India in the tournament's final. Hetmyer scored two half centuries for the Windies during the World Cup.

In April 2017, he was named in the West Indies Test squad for their series against Pakistan. He made his Test debut for the West Indies against Pakistan on 21 April 2017.

In December 2017, he was added to the West Indies' One Day International (ODI) squad ahead of their series against New Zealand. He made his ODI debut for the West Indies against New Zealand on 20 December 2017. He was also added to the West Indies' Twenty20 International (T20I) squad for their series against New Zealand. He made his T20I debut for the West Indies against New Zealand on 1 January 2018.

On 6 March 2018, in the 2018 Cricket World Cup Qualifier, he scored his first ODI century, batting against the United Arab Emirates at the Old Hararians ground in Harare. The West Indies won the game by 60 runs and Hetmyer was named the man of the match.

In February 2019, Hetmyer scored the fastest century by a West Indies batsman against England in an ODI match, doing so from 82 balls.

In April 2019, he was named in the West Indies' squad for the 2019 Cricket World Cup. The International Cricket Council (ICC) named him as one of the five exciting talents making their Cricket World Cup debut. On 17 June 2019, in the match against Bangladesh, Hetmyer scored his 1,000th run in ODIs.

In September 2021, Hetmyer was named in the West Indies' squad for the 2021 ICC Men's T20 World Cup.

Hetmyer was dropped from the West Indies' squad for the tour of Australia and the 2022 ICC Men's T20 World Cup after missing his "rescheduled" flight to Australia.

Personal life
On 8 May 2022, he announced the birth of his first child with wife Nirvani.

References

External links
 

1996 births
Living people
West Indies Test cricketers
West Indies One Day International cricketers
West Indies Twenty20 International cricketers
Guyanese cricketers
People from East Berbice-Corentyne
Guyana Amazon Warriors cricketers
Royal Challengers Bangalore cricketers
West Indies under-19 cricketers
Cricketers at the 2019 Cricket World Cup
Delhi Capitals cricketers
Wicket-keepers
Rajasthan Royals cricketers